Pinalia bractescens is a species of orchid.

References

bractescens
Plants described in 1841
Orchids of New Guinea